Hansapur is a Village Development Committee in Pyuthan, a Middle Hills district of Rapti Zone, western Nepal. The village lies to the northeast of the district sharing its border mainly to Aargakhanchi. The area is mostly inhabited by Brahmins and other castes, too. The village or VDC is a developing area in the district with proper facilities of electricity and communication. The place is well established for ginger (Aduwa) and bee honey (Maha; local).

Etymology

hamsa - soul, spirit, heart
pur- town or city.
Thus: town of souls

Villages in VDC

References

External links
UN map of VDC boundaries, water features and roads in Pyuthan District

Populated places in Pyuthan District